Rokeya Begum is a Bangladesh Jamaat-e-Islami politician and the former Member of Bangladesh Parliament from a reserved seat.

Career
Begum was elected to parliament from reserved seat as a Bangladesh Jamaat-e-Islami candidate in 2005. She was in office from 2005 - 2006.

References

Bangladesh Jamaat-e-Islami politicians
Living people
Women members of the Jatiya Sangsad
8th Jatiya Sangsad members
Year of birth missing (living people)
People from Satkhira District
21st-century Bangladeshi women politicians